Journal of Demographic Economics (JODE) is a peer-reviewed academic journal at the intersection of demography and economics. It is published by Cambridge University Press and edited by the Institute of Economic and Social Research of the UCLouvain. The Journal of Demographic Economics publishes four issues a year.

The Journal of the Demographic Economics (JODE) welcomes both empirical and theoretical papers on issues relevant to Demographic Economics with a preference for combining abstract economic or demographic models together with data to highlight major mechanisms of the interplay between demographics and economics. JODE intends to be the premier demography & economics outlet for empirical contributions that are firmly grounded in theory as well as theoretical papers that are motivated by empirical regularities and findings.

The editor-in-chief of JODE is David de la Croix (UClouvain) and Murat Iyigun (University of Colorado at Boulder) is the Co-Editor. In August 2021, two additional co-editors were appointed: Prof. Hillel Rapoport  (Paris School of Economics) and Prof. Libertad González (Universitat Pompeu Fabra and Barcelona GSE).

According to the Journal Citation Reports, JODE has an impact factor of 1.026 in 2017.

History 
The first issue of the Journal of Demographic Economics appeared in March 2015, but its history can go back as far as 1928. Journal of Demographic Economics was born after the Institute of Economic and Social Research decided to transform its publication Recherches Économiques de Louvain – Louvain Economic Review into an international journal focusing on demographic economics. Louvain Economic Review was a non-specialized academic journal of economics and published papers in French and English. The first issue of Recherches économiques de Louvain – Louvain Economic Review was published in February 1961 and its last issue was published in December 2014. Before 1961, the institute of Economic and social research had another publication called “Bulletin de l’Institut des Sciences Économiques”. The first issue of Bulletins de l’Institut des Sciences Économiques was published in December 1929. The first editorial was signed by Paul van Zeeland.

First issue honoring Gary Becker 
The first issue of the Journal was assembled to commemorate Gary Becker. Becker is one of the most influential scientists of the twentieth century, as recognized by the Nobel Memorial Prize in Economic Sciences awarded to him in 1992. The issue includes eight mini essays penned by economists and demographers, some of whom former Becker students, to dissect Gary Becker's influence on and legacy in various different subfields of demographic economics. An introductory piece by Aloysius Siow precedes these essays and sets in personal perspective the impact Gary Becker has had on the economics profession in general and demographic economics in particular.

References

External links 
 Official Website
 Journal of Demographic Economics on RePEC
 Recherches économiques de Louvain - Louvain Economic Review on Jstor
 Recherches économiques de Louvain - Louvain Economic Review publisher site
 Institute of Economic and Social Research (UCLouvain)

Publications established in 2015
Demography journals
Economics journals
Cambridge University Press academic journals